Matiguás is a town and a municipality in the Matagalpa department of Nicaragua. It is also the twin city of Saarlouis in Germany.

References 

Municipalities of the Matagalpa Department